DataViz, Inc. is a software company located in Westport, Connecticut. They currently sell Docs To Go, Passwords Plus and recently released DailyBalance. The company has been in business since 1984 formerly selling apps such as MacLinkPlus, RoadSync, and Conversions Plus.

On 8 September 2010, they sold their office suite Documents To Go and other assets to Research In Motion for $50 million.

References

External links
Official Website

Software companies based in Connecticut
Software companies of the United States
1984 establishments in the United States
1984 establishments in Connecticut
Software companies established in 1984
Companies established in 1984

Companies based in Fairfield County, Connecticut